The 2016 Japan college football season, involves all play of college football in Japan organized by the Japan American Football Association (JAFA) at the Division I level. The statistics on that season can be found below.

Conference standings

Postseason Bowls

Rice Bowl Playoffs

References

External links
American Football in Japan
Japan American Football Association (Japanese)
NFL Japan Standings (Japanese)

American football in Japan
2016 in Japanese sport
2016 in American football